Brinkworth (postcode 5464) is a town in the Mid North region of South Australia with a current population of 401.

The Brinkworth area was first settled in the 1860s and the town laid out in 1892. Brinkworth is named after the early landowner, George Brinkworth.

Transport 
Brinkworth was a junction on the Gladstone railway line from Adelaide to Gladstone in the north. The other line from Brinkworth went through Snowtown to Kadina and Wallaroo. Both were originally built as narrow gauge . These lines were converted to broad gauge  in 1927 but are now closed.

Governance 
Brinkworth is in the local government area of Wakefield Regional Council, the state electoral district of Frome and the federal division of Grey.

References

External links 
 BrinkworthSA.info: Brinkworth Community web site created and managed by locals

Towns in South Australia
Mid North (South Australia)